Sheikh Muhammad (1560–1650) was a Muslim saint-poet who is venerated by Hindus.

Sheikh Muhammad or alternatively Sheikh Muhammed, Sheikh Mohammad, Sheikh Mohammed may also refer to (in chronological birth order):

 Sheikh Muhammad ibn Abd al-Wahhab (1703–1792), religious leader and theologian from Najd in central Arabia who founded the movement now called Wahhabism
 Sheikh Mohammed Abdullah (1905–1982), Kashmiri politician
 Sheikh Mohamed Siddiq El-Minshawi (1920–1969), Egyptian Qur'anic reciter
 Sheikh Mohammed bin Rashid Al Maktoum (born 1949), Vice President and Prime Minister of the United Arab Emirates (UAE), and ruler of the Emirate of Dubai
 Sheikh Mohammed Karakunnu (born 1950), Indian Islamic scholar and author
 Sheikh Muhammad Tahir Rasheed (born 1954), also known as Tahir Rashid, Pakistani politician who is affiliated with the Pakistan Muslim League
 Sheikh Muhammad Nuru Khalid (born 1960), Nigerian Islamic cleric
 Sheikh Mohamed bin Zayed Al Nahyan (born 1961), president of the United Arab Emirates and ruler of Abu Dhabi

See also